The  Burkan-1 (Arabic 1 بركان) or Volcano-1 (also spelled as Burqan 1) is a mobile short-range ballistic missile used by the Houthis in Yemen. It is related to the Scud missile family.

Development
Houthi forces unveiled the Burkan-1 when it was fired on 2 September 2016. According to Saudi Arabia, the missile and related Volcano H-2 are of Iranian origin, with USAF Lt. General Jeffrey L. Harrigian, Commander, Air Force's Central Command in Qatar, agreeing.

Design
The Burkan-1 is a member of the Scud family. Analysts identify it as being based on either the Scud-B or Scud-D missile. Its range is greater than the Soviet-made Scuds Yemen possessed as of 2015, suggesting that the missile is not of Yemeni origin. Elements of the missile's design, including the inertial guidance system, fins, and control surfaces, are identical to those of the Qiam 1, leading several analysts and the U.S. State Department to believe that the missile is an Iranian-made Qiam 1.

Operational history
The Burkan-1 was first fired on 2 September 2016, aimed at King Fahad Air Base in Taif, with Houthi sources claiming a successful hit but Saudi Arabia claiming there was no damage. On 27 October 2016, another missile was fired, but destroyed in mid-air by a Saudi Patriot missile before reaching its target. According to the Saudi-led coalition the target was Mecca, but according to the Houthis the target was King Abdulaziz International Airport, near Jeddah. On 28 July 2017, another missile was fired on a similar trajectory and intercepted in mid-air, leading to Saudi Arabia again claiming the target was Mecca and the Houthis claiming the target was King Fahad Air Base.

See also

Related articles
Burkan-2
Yemeni Civil War (2015-Present)
Yemeni Armed Forces
Houthi insurgency in Yemen
Conflict in Najran, Jizan and Asir

Comparable missiles
 Ghaznavi
 Abdali-I
 Shaheen-I
 J-600T Yıldırım
 SOM
 Bora
 Fateh-313
 Qiam 1
 Al-Hussein
 Nasr
 Zelzal
 Tondar-69

References 

Military equipment of Yemen
Short-range ballistic missiles
Tactical ballistic missiles
Tactical ballistic missiles of Yemen
Short-range ballistic missiles of Yemen
Surface-to-surface missiles
Surface-to-surface missiles of Yemen
Ballistic missiles
Ballistic missiles of Yemen
Theatre ballistic missiles